Lee Jong-hwa (born February 15, 1994), also known as Jota, is a South Korean actor, singer and model. He is a former member of South Korean boy group Madtown.

Early life
In high school, Lee planned to become a professional judo competitor. However, an ankle injury ended that dream and he decided to pursue a career in entertainment instead.

In 2013, he was a backup dancer in Lee Hyori's "Bad Girls" music video and promotions.

Career
Lee debuted with the South Korean boy group Madtown in October 2014, under his stage name Jota. In December 2015, he auditioned for Our Neighborhood Arts and Physical Education, where he was chosen for judo and was announced as the new ace due to his professional judo skills. He won many matches with experienced judo players. In early January 2016, it was confirmed that he would be a cast member of the Law of the Jungle in Tonga. In May 2016, he joined the fourth season of We Got Married, appearing alongside model Kim Jin-kyung.

In 2017, Madtown disbanded. In October 2018, it was announced that he signed an exclusive contract with King Kong by Starship to promote as an actor under his real name.

Filmography

Variety show

Drama

Awards and nominations

References 

1994 births
J. Tune Entertainment artists
Living people
King Kong by Starship artists
South Korean male idols
South Korean male models
South Korean pop singers
South Korean hip hop dancers
21st-century South Korean male singers